The Good Psychopath's Guide to Success is a self-help book co-authored by the British authors Dr. Kevin Dutton and Andy McNab. The book's premise is that certain traits found in psychopaths can be helpful to someone's personal life. The book describes these traits and tries to explain to the reader how they can be applied to day-to-day life.

Reception
The book was the subject of articles in the NPR and The Daily Telegraph.

References

Books about psychopathy
2014 non-fiction books
Self-help books
Collaborative non-fiction books
Transworld Publishers books